Phanaeini is a tribe of dung beetles in the family Scarabaeidae. There are about 12 genera and 200 described species in Phanaeini.

Genera
These 12 genera belong to the tribe Phanaeini:

 Bolbites Harold, 1868
 Coprophanaeus D'Olsoufieff, 1924
 Dendropaemon Perty, 1830
 Diabroctis Gistel, 1857
 Gromphas Brullé, 1839
 Homalotarsus Janssens, 1932
 Megatharsis Waterhouse, 1891
 Oruscatus Bates, 1870
 Oxysternon Laporte de Castelnau, 1840
 Phanaeus MacLeay, 1819 (rainbow scarabs)
 Sulcophanaeus Olsoufieff, 1924
 Tetrameira

References

Further reading

External links
 

Scarabaeinae